The DC Community Access Network (District of Columbia Community Access Network) (DC-CAN) is a planned 100 gigabit network funded by the city of Washington, D.C. which will make broadband internet access available to universities, businesses, and resellers. It bypasses the monopoly held by telecommunications companies over the middle mile.

References

Broadband
Internet in the United States
Telecommunications in the United States
Network access
Communications in Washington, D.C.